Complesso rupestre di San Liberatore (Italian for Rock-cut complex of Saint Liberator) is a rock-cut architecture located in Serramonacesca, Province of Pescara (Abruzzo, Italy).

History

Architecture

References

External links

 

Hermitages in Abruzzo
Serramonacesca